The Welsh Rugby Union Division Four South West (also called the SWALEC Division Four South West for sponsorship reasons) is a rugby union league in Wales first implemented for the 1995/96 season.

Competition format and sponsorship

Competition
There are 12 clubs in the WRU Division Four South West. During the course of a season (which lasts from September to April) each club plays the others twice, once at their home ground and once at that of their opponents for a total of 22 games for each club, with a total of 132 games in each season. Teams receive four points for a win and two point for a draw, an additional bonus point is awarded to either team if they score four tries or more in a single match. No points are awarded for a loss though the losing team can gain a bonus point for finishing the match within seven points of the winning team. Teams are ranked by total points, then the number of tries scored and then points difference. At the end of each season, the club with the most points is crowned as champion. If points are equal the tries scored then points difference determines the winner. The team who is declared champion at the end of the season is eligible for promotion to the WRU Division Three South West. The two lowest placed teams are relegated into the WRU Division Five South West.

Sponsorship 
In 2008 the Welsh Rugby Union announced a new sponsorship deal for the club rugby leagues with SWALEC valued at £1 million (GBP). The initial three year sponsorship was extended at the end of the 2010/11 season, making SWALEC the league sponsors until 2015. The leagues sponsored are the WRU Divisions one through to seven.

 (2002-2005) Lloyds TSB
 (2005-2008) Asda
 (2008-2015) SWALEC

2011/2012 season

League teams
 Abercrave RFC
 Birchgrove RFC
 Briton Ferry RFC
 Cwmavon RFC
 Glyncorrwg RFC
 Maesteg Celtic RFC
 Nantyffyllon RFC
 Neath Athletic RFC
 Pontardawe RFC
 Pyle RFC
 Resolven RFC
 Trebanos RFC

2011/2012 table

2010/2011 season

League teams
 Abercrave RFC
 Birchgrove RFC
 Bridgend Sports RFC
 Briton Ferry RFC
 Glyncorrwg RFC
 Maesteg Celtic RFC
 Maesteg Harlequins RFC
 Pontardawe RFC
 Porthcawl RFC
 Pyle RFC
 Vardre RFC
 Ystradgynlais RFC

2010/2011 table

2009/2010 season

League teams
 Aberavon Green Stars RFC
 Abercrave RFC
 Glyncorrwg RFC
 Maesteg Celtic RFC
 Pontardawe RFC
 Porthcawl RFC
 Pyle RFC
 Resolven RFC
 Taibach RFC
 Tonna RFC
 Vardre RFC
 Ystradgynlais RFC

2009/2010 Table

2008/2009 season

League teams
 Aberavon Green Stars RFC
 Birchgrove RFC
 Bryncoch RFC
 Glyncorrwg RFC
 Neath Athletic RFC
 Porthcawl RFC
 Pontycymmer RFC
 Resolven RFC
 Taibach RFC
 Vardre RFC
 Ystalyfera RFC
 Ystradgynlais RFC

2008/2009 Table 

1 Brynoch RFC were penalised with a 4-point deduction for not contesting scrums during a game with Glyncorrwg.

2007/2008 season

League teams 
 Abercrave RFC
 Brynamman RFC
 Bryncoch RFC
 Glyncorrwg RFC
 Glynneath RFC
 Hirwaun RFC
 Maesteg Celtic RFC
 Neath Athletic RFC
 Pontycymmer RFC
 Resolven RFC
 Taibach RFC
 Ystalyfera RFC

2007/2008 Table

2006/2007 season 
 Abercrave RFC
 Alltwen RFC
 Birchgrove RFC
 BP RFC
 Briton Ferry RFC
 Glynneath RFC
 Llantwit Major RFC
 Newport Saracens RFC
 Pontycymmer RFC
 Resolven RFC
 Trebanos RFC
 Ystalyfera RFC

References

6